41st parallel may refer to:

41st parallel north, a circle of latitude in the Northern Hemisphere
41st parallel south, a circle of latitude in the Southern Hemisphere